The Rocky Ridge Formation is a volcanic formation cropping out in Newfoundland.

References

Geology of Newfoundland and Labrador